Glynis Hullah (born 8 August 1948) is an English former cricketer who played as a  medium pace bowler. She appeared in 4 Test matches and 15 One Day Internationals for England between 1976 and 1982. Her final WODI appearance was in the final of the 1982 Women's Cricket World Cup. She also played 5 matches for Young England at the 1973 World Cup. She played domestic cricket for Middlesex.

References

External links
 

1948 births
Living people
England women Test cricketers
Young England women cricketers
England women One Day International cricketers
Middlesex women cricketers